Andrés Jaque is an architect, writer and curator. In 2016, he was awarded with the 10th Frederick Kiesler Prize for Architecture and the Arts. In 2014, he won the Silver Lion to the Best Project at the 14th Venice Biennale. His work explores architecture as a cosmopolitical practice. In 2003, he founded the Office for Political Innovation, a trandisciplinary agency working in the intersection of design, research and environmental activism. 

Andrés Jaque is the Dean of Columbia Graduate School of Architecture, Planning and Preservation.

Life and career
Jaque is the author of award-winning architectural projects, including the Reggio School (El Encinar de los Reyes, 2020), the Babin Yar Museum of Memory and Oblivion in Kiev, the Ocean Space for Thyssen-Bornemisza Contemporary Art (Venice, 2018), Casa Sacerdotal Diocesana de Plasencia; 2004. Teddy House (Vigo, 2003, 2005), Mousse City, (Stavanger, 2003); Peace Foam City (Ceuta, 2005); Skin Gardens (Barcelona 2006); the Museo Postal de Bogotá (Bogotá, 2007), Rolling House for the Rolling Society (Barcelona, 2009); the House in Never Never Land (Ibiza, 2009); the ESCARAVOX, (Madrid, 2012), Hänsel and Gretel's Arenas (Madrid, 2013), COSMO PS1 in New York, Rómola (Madrid, 2018) and RunRunRun (Madrid, 2019).

He has also developed a number of architectural experiments meant to interrogate architecture's political agency. The 12 Actions to Make Peter Eisenman Transparent, 2010, a project devoted to make public the political implications of the construction of the singular building site Cidade da Cultura in Santiago de Compostela. A series of actions described by Bruno Latour as a «beautiful mixture of art, politics and building-site».

His 2012 intervention in the Barcelona Pavilion, ‘PHANTOM. Mies as Rendered Society’ made visible all the processes involved in the daily fabrication of the pavilion as an ordinary reality. Buckets, flags, chairs, old faded curtains, the salt that keeps the ponds pristine or the result of failed experiments carried out at the pavilion, were kept at the so far unnoticed basement. This work is part of the collection of the Art Institute of Chicago, and it is at shown as part of its permanent exhibition. 

His work 'IKEA Disobedients' (Madrid, New York 2012) was the first architectural performance to be included in the MoMA's collection.

Andrés Jaque holds a PhD degree in architecture, has been Tessenow Stipendiat, Graham Foundation Grantee, and is Professor of Architecture and the Dean of Columbia University GSAPP and previously he has been Visiting Professor at Princeton University School of Architecture and the Cooper Union.

He is the Chief Curator of the 13th Shanghai Art Biennale, titled ‘Bodies of Water’, and co-curator of Manifesta 12 in Palermo, ‘The Planetary Garden. Cultivating Coexistence’.

Books
Andrés Jaque and the Office for Political Innovation have made major contributions to conceptualize the implications of political ecology and post-foundational politics for contemporary architectural and urban practices. They are the authors of:
’Superpowers of Scale’. Columbia Press. 2020 
'Mies y la gata Niebla. Ensayos sobre arquitectura y cosmopolítica'. Puente Editores. 2018  
’More-Than-Human’ With M. Otero and L. Pietroiusti. Idea Books. 2020 
'PHANTOM. Mies as Rendered Society'. Fundació Mies van der Rohe 2013.  
‘Andrés Jaque. Everyday Politics’. EA! Ediciones. 2011.  
‘Dulces Arenas Cotidianas’. Lugadero. 2013.  
'Calculable-Transmaterial'. ARQ. 2017.  
'Different Kinds of Water Pouring Into A Swimming Pool'. RedCat CalArts. 2014 

Jaque has made regular contributions to both specialized and general media. With significant publications in leading architectural magazines such as El Croquis, Domus, Perspecta Yale, Thresholds Journal MIT, Log, Volume and Beyond; and regular works for broader audiences, including Babelia, the cultural supplement of El País, and La SER radio station where Jaque holds a regular participation on architectural and urban concerns. From 2013 to 2016 he published the periodic column "Cuarto de estar en la galaxia" in El País Senanal.

Film
’Sales Oddity. Milano 2 and the politics of direct-to-home TV-urbanism’ Silver Lion to the Best Project, 2014 Venice Biennale. Milano. 2014 

’Intimate Strangers. The archiurbanisms of hook-up locative media’. London. 2016 

’Pornified Homes’. Oslo. 2018 

’The Transscalar Architecture of Covid 19’ Andrés Jaque and Iván L. Munuera. 2020

References

External links

Hans Ulrich Obrist interviews Andrés Jaque
Christopher Hawthorne profiles Andrés Jaque for Architect
"Architecture as Rendered Society" Andrés Jaque's lecture at Princeton SoA 
IKEA Disobedients at the MoMA Collection
Baraona, Ethel "The Value of the Onfra Ordinary" (Domus. Milano 2013)
"Architecture as Rendered Socitety. Andrés Jaque in conversation with Ignacio González Galán" (Volume #33 Interiors. Rotterdam 2012)
"Andrés Jaque. Everyday Politics". (EA! Editions. 2012)
Jaque, Andrés "Eco-Ordinary. Codes for Quotidian Architectural Practices" (Lampreave Editions. 2011)
Jaque, Andrés "Dulces arenas cotidianas" (Lugadero. 2013)
Jaque, Andrés "Collective Experiments. Video-interviews and Tele-conversations in the time of the technical codes" (El Croquis N.148) 
Jaque, Andrés "Collective Experiments. Interiors, Views and Multiverses" (El Croquis N.149) 
Jaque, Andrés "15M. Yes We Camp. Urbanism as Controversy" (Domus. Milano 2011)
Jaque, Andrés "Janet Rodríguez's Parliament" (Beyond. Rotterdam 2009)
Jaque, Andrés "Different Kinds of Water Pouring Into a Swimming Pool" (RedCat CalArts. 2014)
Jaque, Andrés "Calculable-Transmaterial" (ARQ. 2017)

1971 births
Spanish architects
Living people
People from Madrid
Polytechnic University of Madrid alumni
Columbia Graduate School of Architecture, Planning and Preservation faculty